Clenbuterol is a sympathomimetic amine used by sufferers of breathing disorders as a decongestant and bronchodilator. People with chronic breathing disorders such as asthma use this as a bronchodilator to make breathing easier. It is most commonly available as the hydrochloride salt, clenbuterol hydrochloride.

It was patented in 1967 and came into medical use in 1977.

Medical uses
Clenbuterol is approved for use in some countries as a bronchodilator for asthma.

Clenbuterol is a β2 agonist with some structural and pharmacological similarities to epinephrine and salbutamol, but its effects are more potent and longer-lasting as a stimulant and thermogenic drug. It is commonly used for smooth muscle-relaxant properties as a bronchodilator and tocolytic.

It is classified by the World Anti-Doping Agency as an anabolic agent, not as a β2 agonist.

Clenbuterol is prescribed for treatment of respiratory diseases for horses, and as an obstetrical aid in cattle. It is illegal in some countries to use in livestock used for food.

Side effects
Clenbuterol can cause these side effects:
 Nervousness
 Thyrotoxicosis
 Tachycardia
 Subaortic stenosis
 High blood pressure

Overdosage
Use over the recommended dose of about 120 μg can cause muscle tremors, headache, dizziness, and gastric irritation. Persons self-administering the drug for weight loss or to improve athletic performance have experienced nausea, vomiting, diaphoresis, palpitations, tachycardia, and myocardial infarction. Use of the drug may be confirmed by detecting its presence in semen or urine.

Society and culture

Legal status
Clenbuterol is not an ingredient of any therapeutic drug approved by the US Food and Drug Administration and is now banned for IOC-tested athletes. In the US, administration of clenbuterol to any animal that could be used as food for human consumption is banned by the FDA.

Weight-loss
Although often used by bodybuilders during their "cutting" cycles, the drug has been more recently known to the mainstream, particularly through publicized stories of use by celebrities such as Victoria Beckham, Britney Spears, and Lindsay Lohan, for its off-label use as a weight-loss drug similar to usage of other sympathomimetic amines such as ephedrine, despite the lack of sufficient clinical testing either supporting or negating such use.
In 2021, Odalis Santos Mena, a Mexican fitness influencer, died after suffering a cardiac arrest while being anesthetized for a procedure of miraDry, a treatment that uses thermal energy to eliminate underarm sweat glands. The coroner reported that Mena's death was attributed to a combination of Clenbuterol and anesthesia.

Performance-enhancing drug

A common misconception about Clenbuterol is that it has anabolic properties, and can increase muscle mass when used in higher dosages. This claim has never been substantiated, and likely originated from equine research. A beta-2 agonist, Clenbuterol has been found to increase short-term work rate and cardiovascular output, and consequently, its anabolic effects in horses can be attributed to exercise output and increased caloric intake. Given its ability to increase basal metabolic rate, maximum heart rate, and exercise output, Clenbuterol has ergogenic properties more closely related to ephedrine or amphetamine. 

The notion that Clenbuterol is an anabolic agent likely originated from author and renowned authority on performance-enhancement Dan Duchaine. Duchaine popularized the drug in the bodybuilding community, and was the first to suggest the drug had muscle-building properties. Likewise, Duchaine erred in promoting the drug Gamma-hydroxybutyric acid (GHB) as an anabolic agent, and served time for the unlawful possession and distribution of the drug in the mid-1990s.
As of 2011, the World Anti-Doping Agency (WADA) listed Clenbuterol as an anabolic agent, despite the fact there is no evidence to suggest this is the case. 

As a β2 sympathomimetic, clenbuterol has also been used as a performance-enhancing drug.

A three-year suspension for taking clenbuterol kept sprinter Katrin Krabbe from competing in the 1992 Summer Olympics, and effectively ended her athletic career.

In 2006, San Francisco Giants pitcher Guillermo Mota, while a member of the New York Mets, received a 50-game suspension after testing positive for clenbuterol.  In 2012, MLB officials announced they were again suspending Mota for 100 games due a positive test for clenbuterol.

American swimmer Jessica Hardy tested positive at the US trials in 2008. She was subject to a one-year suspension, having claimed she unknowingly took the drug in a contaminated food supplement.  Former New York Mets clubhouse employee Kirk Radomski admitted  in his plea deal to distributing clenbuterol to dozens of current and former Major League Baseball players and associates. After finishing fourth in the K-2 1000-m event at the 2008 Summer Olympics in Beijing, Polish sprint canoer Adam Seroczyński was disqualified for taking this drug, and Chinese cyclist Li Fuyu tested positive for it at the Dwars door Vlaanderen race in Belgium on March 24, 2010.

In  2010, St. Louis Cardinals minor-league shortstop Lainer Bueno received a 50-game suspension for the 2011 season as a result of testing positive for clenbuterol.

Cyclist Alberto Contador of Spain was banned for two years from professional cycling after testing positive for the drug at the 2010 Tour de France. He was later stripped of the 2010 title of the Tour de France and the 2011 title of the Giro d'Italia. CAS found that Contador probably tested positive due to a contaminated food supplement. In 2013, Contador's teammate on the Team Saxo Bank squad, Michael Rogers, tested positive for clenbuterol at the Japan Cup bike race. In April 2014, the Union Cycliste Internationale announced that it accepted Rogers' explanation that the substance had been ingested by him after consuming contaminated meat whilst competing at the 2013 Tour of Beijing, upholding Rogers' disqualification from the Japan Cup, but declining to impose any further sanctions on him.

In 2011, players of the Mexico national football team were found with clenbuterol in their bloodstreams, but were acquitted by WADA after they claimed the clenbuterol came from contaminated food. FIFA has also claimed 109 players from multiple countries
who were participating in the Under-17 World Cup in Mexico tested positive for this drug. However, FIFA and the World Anti-Doping Agency declined to prosecute any cases because the weight of evidence pointed to contamination from Mexican meat.

In 2013, Mexican boxer Erik Morales was suspended for two years after testing positive for clenbuterol.

In 2014, Toronto Maple Leafs Forward Carter Ashton was suspended from the NHL for 20 games without pay for violating the NHL/NHL Players' Association Performance Enhancing Substances Program after it was determined that he had ingested clenbuterol. Carter claimed he used an unprescribed asthma inhaler.

In 2014, South Korean swimmer Kim Ji-heun has tested positive for clenbuterol at an out-of-competition test on May 13, 2014. After completion of proceedings by the Korea Anti-Doping Disciplinary Panel, Kim received a two-year suspension, back-dated to the day of his positive test.

In 2014, Czech body builder Petr Soukup received a lifetime ban after a positive test for clenbuterol along with methenolone, mesterolone, methamphetamine, oxandrolone, stanozolol, nandrolone, fluoxymesterone, CDMT ("Oral Turinabol"), and metandienone.

In 2015, Yankees minor-league pitching prospect Moises Cedeno tested positive for clenbuterol and was suspended for 72 games.
 
In 2015, two players from the Collingwood Football Club in Australia were delisted from the club and accepted two-year bans from all sport in Australia after testing positive to the substance, which they believe may have been in a contaminated illicit drug they consumed.

In 2016, Australian heavyweight boxing champion Lucas Browne tested positive for clenbuterol.

In 2016, Raul A. Mondesi tested positive for clenbuterol and was suspended 50 games from the Northwest Arkansas Naturals.  MLB and the MLBPA agreed to reduce the suspension from 80 games to 50 games after Mondesi claimed it was found in cold medicine.

In 2016, the California State Athletic Commission decided to issue Francisco Vargas  a temporary boxing license on a probationary basis after he tested positive for clenbuterol.

In 2018, British Olympic sprinter Nigel Levine was provisionally suspended for failing a drug test.

In March 2018, champion boxer Canelo Alvarez tested positive for clenbuterol on two consecutive urine tests in February 2018. This violation led to the cancellation of a heavily anticipated rematch between Alvarez and Gennady Golovkin, which was to be held on May 5, 2018.

Food contamination
Clenbuterol is occasionally referred to as "bute" and this risks confusion with phenylbutazone, also called "bute". Phenylbutazone, which is a drug also used with horses, was tested for in the 2013 European meat adulteration scandal.

Intended to result in leaner meat with a higher muscle-to-fat ratio, the use of clenbuterol has been banned in meat since 1991 in the US and since 1996 in the European Union. The drug is banned due to health concerns about symptoms noted in consumers. These include increased heart rate, muscular tremors, headaches, nausea, fever, and chills. In several cases in Europe, these adverse symptoms have been temporary.

Clenbuterol is a growth-promoting drug in the β agonist class of compounds. It is not licensed for use in China, the United States, or the EU for food-producing animals, but some countries have approved it for animals not used for food, and a few countries have approved it for therapeutic uses in food-producing animals.

Not just athletes are affected by contamination. In Portugal, 50 people were reported as affected by clenbuterol in liver and pork between 1998 and 2002, while in 1990, veal liver was suspected of causing clenbuterol poisoning in 22 people in France and 135 people in Spain.

In September 2006, some 330 people in Shanghai suffered from food poisoning after eating clenbuterol-contaminated pork.

In February 2009, at least 70 people in one Chinese province (Guangdong) suffered food poisoning after eating pig organs believed to contain clenbuterol residue. The victims complained of stomach aches and diarrhea after eating pig organs bought in local markets.

In March 2011, China's Ministry of Agriculture said the government would launch a one-year crackdown on illegal additives in pig feed, after a subsidiary of Shuanghui Group, China's largest meat producer, was exposed for using clenbuterol-contaminated pork in its meat products. A total of 72 people in central Henan Province, where Shuanghui is based, were taken into police custody for allegedly producing, selling, or using clenbuterol. The situation has dramatically improved in China since September 2011, when a ban of clenbuterol was announced by China's Ministry of Agriculture.

Authorities around the world appear to be issuing stricter food safety requirements, such as the Food Safety Modernization Act in the United States, Canada's revision of their import regulations, China's new food laws published since 2009, South Africa's new food law, and many more global changes and restrictions.

Veterinary use
Clenbuterol is administered as an aerosol for the treatment of allergic respiratory disease in horses as a bronchodilator, and intravenously in cattle to relax the uterus in cows at the time of parturition, specifically to facilitate exteriorisation of the uterus during Caesarian section surgery. It is licensed for obstetrical use in cattle as Planipart Solution for Injection.

See also 
Mabuterol (same structure as clenbuterol but one of the chloro groups has been changed to a trifluoromethyl group instead).
Cimaterol

References

Further reading 

 

Beta2-adrenergic agonists
Equine medications
Chloroarenes
Drugs in sport
World Anti-Doping Agency prohibited substances
Phenylethanolamines